USS Onset (SP-1224) was a United States Navy patrol vessel in commission from 1917 to 1918.

Onset was built as a private motorboat of the same name in 1888 by Hacketts at Bayonne, New Jersey. She was rebuilt in 1910. On 15 June 1917, the U.S. Navy acquired Onset from her owner, W. H. Steelman of Chincoteague, Virginia, for use as a section patrol boat during World War I. She was commissioned as USS Onset (SP-1224).

Assigned to the 5th Naval District and based at Norfolk, Virginia, Onset performed patrol duties for the rest of World War I.

The Navy decommissioned Onset on 21 December 1918 and returned her to Steelman the same day.

References

SP-1224 Onset at Department of the Navy Naval History and Heritage Command Online Library of Selected Images: U.S. Navy Ships -- Listed by Hull Number "SP" #s and "ID" #s -- World War I Era Patrol Vessels and other Acquired Ships and Craft numbered from SP-1200 through SP-1299
NavSource Online: Section Patrol Craft Photo Archive Onset (SP 1224)

Patrol vessels of the United States Navy
World War I patrol vessels of the United States
Ships built in Bayonne, New Jersey
1888 ships